The Tuamotu Archipelago or the Tuamotu Islands (officially ) are a French Polynesian chain of just under 80 islands and atolls in the southern Pacific Ocean. They constitute the largest chain of atolls in the world, extending (from northwest to southeast) over an area roughly the size of Western Europe. This archipelago's major islands are Anaa, Fakarava, Hao and Makemo.

The Tuamotus have approximately 16,000 inhabitants. The islands were initially settled by Polynesians, and modern Tuamotuans have inherited from them a shared culture and the Tuamotuan language.

The Tuamotus are a French overseas collectivity.

History 
The early history of the Tuamotu islands is generally unknown. Archaeological findings suggest that the western Tuamotus were settled from the Society Islands as early as 900 CE or as late as 1200 CE.  DNA evidence suggests that they were settled about 1110 CE. On the islands of Rangiroa, Manihi and Mataiva, there are flat ceremonial platforms (called marae) made of coral blocks, although their exact age is unknown.

The first known European encounter with the Tuamotus was with the Portuguese sailor Ferdinand Magellan, during his circumglobal voyage in 1521, undertaken in the service of the Spanish Crown. His encounter was followed by visits from several other Europeans, including:
Portuguese sailor Pedro Fernandes de Queirós in 1606, sailing in the service of the Spanish Crown;
Dutch mariners Willem Schouten and Jacob Le Maire in 1616;
Jacob Roggeveen (who also first sighted Easter Island) in 1722;
John Byron in 1765;
Louis Antoine de Bougainville in 1768;
James Cook during his first voyage in 1769;
Spanish navigator Domingo de Bonechea in 1774 and
Russian expedition of Otto von Kotzebue in 1815.
None of these visits were of political consequence, as the islands were within the sphere of influence of the Pōmare Dynasty of Tahiti.

The first Christian missionaries arrived in the islands at the beginning of the 19th century. By the late 19th century, traders had begun offering  pearls from the islands for sale in  Europe, and they became coveted possessions there. France forced the abdication of King Pōmare V of Tahiti and claimed the islands, but did not formally annex them.

Robert Louis Stevenson and Fanny Stevenson travelled among the Taumotus (then called the Paumotus) on the yacht Casco in 1888; an account of their journey was published as In the South Seas. Jack London wrote a story, "The Seed of McCoy", based on an incident in 1900 in which a burning ship, the Pyrenees, had been safely beached on Mangareva. In the story, London has the ship sail past Mangareva and all through the Tuamotus before beaching on Fakarava.

The Tuamotus made headlines around the world in 1947, when the Norwegian ethnographer Thor Heyerdahl, sailing from South America with a crew of five others, reached Raroia on his raft Kon-Tiki. The islands were in the news again somewhat later, when France conducted nuclear weapons testing on the atolls of Moruroa and Fangataufa.

Administrative divisions 

French Polynesia is a semi-autonomous island group designated as an overseas country of France. The Tuamotus combine with the Gambier Islands to form the Îles Tuamotu-Gambier which is one of the five administrative divisions of French Polynesia.

The Tuamotus are grouped into sixteen communes: Anaa; Arutua; Fakarava; Fangatau; Hao; Hikueru; Makemo; Manihi; Napuka; Nukutavake; Puka Puka; Rangiroa; Reao; Takaroa; Tatakoto; and Tureia.

Electoral divisions 

The communes on Tuamotu are part of two different electoral districts (circonscriptions électorales) represented in the Assembly of French Polynesia. The electoral district called Îles Gambier et Tuamotu Est comprises the commune of Gambier and eleven communes in eastern Tuamotu: Anaa, Fangatau, Hao, Hikueru, Makemo, Napuka, Nukutavake, Pukapuka, Reao, Tatakoto, and Tureia. The other five communes in western Tuamotu – Arutua, Fakarava, Manihi, Rangiroa, and Takaroa – form the electoral district called Îles Tuamotu Ouest.

Geography 
The climate is a warm tropical one, without sharply distinct seasons. The average annual temperature is a relatively continuous . Water sources such as lakes or rivers are absent, leaving catchments of rain as the only source of fresh water. Although average rainfall is lowest in September and November, it does not vary markedly throughout the year.

The archipelago is geologically highly stable, because it was created by the action of the Easter Fracture Zone, which is only weakly active. There have been no volcanic eruptions during recorded history.

Flora and fauna 

The sparse soil of the coral islands does not support diverse vegetation. The coconut palm, which is the basis of copra production, is of special economic importance. On a few of the islands, vanilla is also cultivated. Agriculture is generally otherwise limited to simple subsistence. Fruit and vegetable staples include yams, taro,  breadfruit, and a wide range of tropical fruit. Pandanus leaves are traditionally woven together to make mats, hats, and roof thatches. However, many of the roofs nowadays are made of corrugated sheet-metal.

The species-rich reefs are home to a diverse range of underwater fauna. The surface creatures are primarily seabirds, insects, and lizards. The Tuamotus have 86 species of birds, ten of which are endemic, including the Tuamotu kingfisher, the Tuamotu reed warbler, and the Tuamotu sandpiper. Thirteen species are globally threatened, and one has gone extinct.

Geology 
All of the islands of the Tuamotus are coral "low islands": essentially high sand bars built upon coral reefs. Makatea, southwest of the Palliser Islands, is one of three great phosphate rocks in the Pacific Ocean. (The others are Banaba in Kiribati, and the island nation of Nauru.) Although the Gambier Islands are geographically part of the Tuamotus because they lie at the southeastern extreme of the archipelago, they are geologically and culturally distinct.

The ring-shaped atoll Taiaro, which lies in the northwestern portion of the archipelago, is a rare example of a coral reef that has a fully enclosed lagoon. Taiaro has been officially designated a UNESCO biosphere reserve since 1977.

Island groups
The Tuamotu archipelago consists of eight groups of small islands and atolls:

Disappointment Islands
Napuka
Puka-Puka
Tepoto (North) (Tepoto Nord)

Duke of Gloucester Islands

Anuanuraro
Anuanurunga
Hereheretue
Nukutepipi

Far East Tuamotu Group

Akiaki
Fakahina
Fangatau
Fangataufa
Moruroa
Nukutavake
Pinaki
Pukarua
Reao
Tatakoto
Tematangi
Tureia
Vahitahi
Vairaatea
Vanavana

Hao Group
Ahunui
Amanu
Hao
Manuhangi
Nengonengo
Paraoa
Rekareka (Tehuata)
Tauere

Hikueru Group

Hikueru
Marokau
Ravahere
Reitoru
Tekokota

King George Islands

Ahe
Manihi
Takaroa
Takapoto
Tikei

Palliser Islands

Arutua
Apataki
Avatika
Fakarava
Kaukura
Makatea
Mataiva
Niau
Rangiroa
Toau
Tikehau

Raeffsky Islands

Anaa
Aratika
Faaite
Haraiki
Hiti
Katiu
Kauehi
Makemo
Marutea Nord
Motutunga
Nihiru
Raraka
Raroia
Taenga
Tahanea
Taiaro
Takume
Tepoto (South) (Tepoto Sud)
Tuanake

Related island groups include:
 The Gambier Group: Akamaru; Angakauitai; Aukena; Kamaka; Kouaku; Makapu; Makaroa; Mangareva; Manui; Mekiro; Papuri; Puaumu; Taravai; Tokorua; and Totengengie.
 The Outer Gambier Group: Marutea Sud; Maria Est; Morane; and Temoe.
 The Acteon Group: Matureivavao; Tenararo; Tenarunga; and Vahanga.

Demographics 
A little more than fifty atolls are permanently populated; the rest are only occupied sporadically, during the copra harvesting season or as a base for fishing expeditions. The population has grown in the last years due to the fishing boom in the northern part and the extraction of pearls, especially black pearls, in the west and in the center. In any case, most of the inhabitants practice subsistence agriculture.

In the 2007 census, there were 15,510 inhabitants in the Tuamotu Islands, a population density of 18 inhabitants/km². The population was 14,876 in 2002 and 8,100 in 1983. In 2002, 769 inhabitants lived within 400 km of the islands of Moruroa and Fangataufa (former nuclear test base).

Languages 
The official language of the archipelago is French. However, the Tuamotu language, Pa'umotu, is recognized as a regional language of the French Republic. In the Gambier Islands, Mangarevian is spoken, while in Puka Puka a Marquesan dialect is used.

Religion 
The majority of the population is Christian, including members of the Catholic Church and various Protestant groups. The Catholic Church administers 42 churches on the islands under the Metropolitan Archdiocese of Papeete.

In 1833, the Catholic Church divided the Pacific into two apostolic vicariates: Western Oceania fell to the Marists and Eastern Oceania-which included the Tuamots, Hawaii, Tahiti, the Marquesas and the Cook Islands-was the responsibility of the Picpus missionaries. In 1834, the French Fathers Honoré Laval and François d'Assise Caret arrived in Mangareva.

First with the acquiescence and then with the active support of the island chiefs, the Picpusians embarked on an extensive development program for the Gambier Islands. This included the introduction of cotton cultivation, pearl and mother-of-pearl fishing, and the establishment of plantations and orchards. As they were very successful, their missionary activities gradually spread to the other islands of the Tuamotu archipelago. With the missionary work, news of the islands' wealth in pearls also reached Europe, making them a coveted destination for European traders and adventurers.

Economy 
The islands' economy is predominantly based on subsistence agriculture. The most important sources of additional income are the cultivation of black pearls and the preparation of copra. Tourism-related income remains meager, especially compared to the income generated by tourism in the neighboring Society Islands. Modest tourism infrastructure is found on the atolls of Rangiroa and Manihi, which offer recreational scuba diving and snorkeling destinations.

The inhabitants of Tuamotu produce 75% of the copra of French Polynesia. It is a subsidized family activity and the only resource of the atolls farthest from the center and east.

Fishing is a major activity in the atolls closest to Tahiti (Rangiroa, Arutua, Apataki), which supply the central market of Papeete.

See also

 French overseas departments and territories
 Islands controlled by France in the Indian and Pacific oceans

References

External links 

 Stevenson, Robert L. (1896), In the South Seas
Official site (Tahiti Tourism board)
Official site (Geography)
Official site (Administration)
Archipel des Tuamotu

 
Eastern Indo-Pacific
Marine ecoregions